Robert Ray Rigsby (born December 4, 1960) is an associate judge of the Superior Court of the District of Columbia and former corporation counsel of the District of Columbia.

Early life and career
Rigsby was born in San Francisco and raised in Vallejo, California. His father was a cook in the United States Army, and his mother was a nurse. While in college at San Jose State University, Rigsby was commissioned a second lieutenant in the United States Army Reserve. He became a JAG after graduating from University of California, Hastings College of the Law, and remained in the Army until 2014. He worked briefly as an assistant United States attorney in the Eastern District of Virginia in 1992, after which he joined the office of the Corporation Counsel for the District of Columbia as head of the criminal division. He worked his way up through the office, becoming Corporation Counsel (an office later renamed Attorney General for the District of Columbia) in February 2000.

Rigsby was nominated to the superior court by President George W. Bush on March 2, 2002, and confirmed by the United States Senate on July 25, 2002. He was sworn in on October 11, 2002.

Personal life
He is married to Anna Blackburne-Rigsby, chief judge of the District of Columbia Court of Appeals, who served alongside him on the Superior Court until 2006.

References

1960 births
Living people
20th-century African-American people
21st-century American judges
21st-century African-American people
African-American judges
Assistant United States Attorneys
District of Columbia Attorneys General
Judges of the Superior Court of the District of Columbia
San Jose State University alumni
University of California, Hastings College of the Law alumni